Peter Mackie may refer to:

 Sir Peter Mackie, 1st Baronet (1855–1924), Scottish distiller
 Peter Mackie (footballer) (born 1958), Scottish footballer
 Peter Mackie, Australian bassist of The Cockroaches